"Straight Out the Sewer" is a song by American hip hop group Das EFX recorded for their debut album Dead Serious (1992). The song was released as the third and final single for the album in November 1992.

Track listings
12", Vinyl
"Straight Out the Sewer" (Remix #1 - Clean Version) - 3:36
"Straight Out the Sewer" (Remix #2) - 3:42
"Straight Out the Sewer" (Dub) - 3:42
"Straight Out the Sewer" (LP Version) - 3:22
"East Coast" (Remix) - 4:16
"East Coast" (Dub) - 4:16
"Hard Like a Criminal" (Uncensored - Bonus Track Not on LP) - 4:04
"East Coast" (LP Version) - 4:29

CD, Maxi-Single
"Straight Out the Sewer" (Remix #1) - 3:37
"Straight Out the Sewer" (Remix #2) - 3:42
"East Coast" (Remix) - 4:16
"Hard Like a Criminal (Censored - Bonus Track Not on LP) - 4:05

Personnel
Information taken from Discogs.
additional production – Solid Scheme (Chris Charity, Derek Lynch)
arranging – Solid Scheme
executive production – EPMD
guitar – Bobby Sitchran
production – Solid Scheme
remixing – Solid Scheme

Chart performance

Notes

1992 singles
Das EFX songs
1992 songs
East West Records singles
Atlantic Records singles